North Carolina Highway 522 (NC 522) is a primary state highway in the U.S. state of North Carolina. The highway runs north–south from the South Carolina state line, near Sapps Crossroads to NC 200 in Roughedge, entirely in Union County.

Route description

NC 522 is a short  two-lane rural highway in Union County, passing through an area of mixed forest and farmland.

History
Established as a new primary routing around 1951, it is complementary extension of SC 522; unchanged since.

Junction list

References

External links

NCRoads.com: N.C. 522

522
Transportation in Union County, North Carolina